Steve Maslow (born October 17, 1944) is an American sound engineer. He won three Academy Awards for Best Sound and has been nominated for four more in the same category. He has worked on more than 200 films since 1978.

Selected filmography
Maslow has won three Academy Awards for Best Sound and has been nominated for four more in the same category.

Won
 Star Wars — Episode V: The Empire Strikes Back (1980)
 Raiders of the Lost Ark (1981)
 Speed (1994)

Nominated
 Dune (1984)
 Waterworld (1995)
 Twister (1996)
 U-571 (2000)

References

External links

1944 births
Living people
American audio engineers
Best Sound Mixing Academy Award winners
Best Sound BAFTA Award winners
People from Los Angeles
Engineers from California